Santee is a historic farm located in Caroline County, Virginia. Construction first began in the late 18th century with additions made throughout the 19th century.

It was listed on the National Register of Historic Places in 1979.

References

Plantation houses in Virginia
Houses on the National Register of Historic Places in Virginia
Houses completed in 1820
Houses in Caroline County, Virginia
National Register of Historic Places in Caroline County, Virginia